The Government of Guangdong were governments formed in Guangdong of Guangzhou several times from 1917 to 1936 by the Nationalist Government of the Republic of China, before their retreat/evacuation to Taiwan.

 The First Government of Guangdong (September 1917 - October 1920) - It was called "Military Government of Republic of China" or "Military Government of Guangdong" or "Military Government of Constitutional Protection" (護法軍政府), "Guangdong Military Government", etc. Sun Yat-sen (孫文) was appointed as "大総統" (Grand President). In 1918, Cen Chunxuan (岑春煊) was appointed as "主席総裁", meaning President-Chairman. It was formed during the Beiyang period to oppose the Beiyang Government, as part of the Constitution protection movement.
 The Second Government of Guangdong (May 1921 - June 1922) -  It was called "中華民国政府" or "中華民国正式政府". Sun Yat-sen (孫文) was appointed as "非常大総統".
 The Third Government of Guangdong (March 1923 - June 1925)  - It was called "中華民国陸海軍大元帥府大本営" or "広東大元帥府" or "広東大本営" or "広東革命政府", etc. Sun Yat-sen (孫文) was appointed as "大元帥".
 The Fourth Government of Guangdong (July 1925 - December 1926) - It was called "広州（広東）国民政府". Wang Jingwei (汪兆銘) was appointed as "主席委員".
 The Fifth Government of Guangdong (May 1931 - July 1936) - It was called "広州（広東）国民政府". Anti Sun Yat-sen (孫文) parties were gathered but it was collapsed after the Mukden Incident (満州事変) by the escape of the Chief Chen Jitang (陳済棠).

Guangdong